Fossil Oregon Short Line Depot in Kemmerer, Wyoming was listed on the National Register of Historic Places in 2013.

The station was moved to its current location in 1902 due to trains overshooting it at its previous location due to too much slope;  the entire town of Fossil moved along with the station.  It is located about .4 mi. WNW of the junction of US 30 and County Rd. 300.  The station is a  variation on the standard Union Pacific 24x64 plan, expanded to be longer in 1902 after the move.   A Western Union Telegraph office was located in the station, in addition to the depot having a passenger area, a freight storage area, and living quarters for the station master and his family.

The listing also includes an outhouse/coal storage outbuilding.

References

Railway stations on the National Register of Historic Places in Wyoming
Union Pacific Railroad stations
Railway stations in the United States opened in 1902
National Register of Historic Places in Lincoln County, Wyoming
Former railway stations in Wyoming
1902 establishments in Wyoming
Transportation in Lincoln County, Oregon
Relocated buildings and structures in Oregon
Oregon Short Line Railroad